Juan Carlos Ibañez (March 20, 1969 – October 4, 2015) was an Argentine footballer who played for clubs of Argentina, Chile, Perú, Spain and Colombia.

Death
Ibañez was born in General San Martín, Chaco, Argentina. Nicknamed el Bombero, Ibáñez was assaulted on 3 October 2015 and died of his wounds in a General San Martín hospital the following day.

Honours

Club
Universidad de Chile
 Primera División de Chile (2): 1994, 1995

References

External links
 

1969 births
2015 deaths
Argentine footballers
Argentine expatriate footballers
Argentine Primera División players
Categoría Primera A players
Chilean Primera División players
Club Atlético Independiente footballers
UD Salamanca players
El Porvenir footballers
Sport Boys footballers
Deportivo Cali footballers
Universidad de Chile footballers
Unión Española footballers
Cobresal footballers
Deportes Concepción (Chile) footballers
Expatriate footballers in Chile
Expatriate footballers in Peru
Expatriate footballers in Spain
Expatriate footballers in Colombia
Association football forwards
People from General José de San Martín, Chaco
Sportspeople from Chaco Province